Baglo is a town in the Volta Region of Ghana. The town is known for the Baglo Secondary School.  The school is a second cycle institution.

References

Populated places in the Volta Region